Mount Hoffmann is a prominent peak in northeastern Mariposa County in the center of Yosemite National Park, California, United States. The mountain is named for the cartographer Charles F. Hoffmann, who was part of the California Geological Survey of the Sierra Nevada.

See also

 Tuolumne Peak,  miles off

References

External links 
 
 

Mountains of Yosemite National Park
Mountains of Mariposa County, California
Mountains of Northern California